The 2014–15 NOJHL season was the 37th season of the Northern Ontario Junior Hockey League (NOJHL). The nine teams of the NOJHL played 56-game schedules.

Come February, the top teams of each division will play down for the Copeland-McNamara Trophy, the NOJHL championship.  The winner of the Copeland-McNamara Trophy will compete in the Central Canadian Junior "A" championship, the Dudley Hewitt Cup.  If successful against the winners of the Ontario Junior Hockey League and Superior International Junior Hockey League, the champion would then move on to play in the Canadian Junior Hockey League championship, the 2015 Royal Bank Cup.

Changes 
Elliot Lake Bobcats relocate to Cochrane, Ontario and become Cochrane Crunch.
Espanola Rivermen leave league for CIHL.
North Bay Trappers relocate to Mattawa, Ontario and become Mattawa Blackhawks.
Elliot Lake Wildcats of Elliot Lake, Ontario are granted expansion.
Powassan Voodoos of Powassan, Ontario are granted expansion.

Final standings
Note: GP = Games played; W = Wins; L = Losses; OTL = Overtime losses; SL = Shootout losses; GF = Goals for; GA = Goals against; PTS = Points; x = clinched playoff berth; y = clinched division title; z = clinched conference title

Teams listed on the official league website.

Standings listed on official league website.

2015 Copeland-McNamara Trophy Playoffs

Playoff results are listed on the official league website.

2015 Dudley Hewitt Cup Championship
Hosted by the Fort Frances Lakers of the Superior International Junior Hockey League in Fort Frances, Ontario. The Soo Thunderbirds represented the NOJHL and won the Dudley Hewitt Cup.

Round Robin
Soo Thunderbirds defeated Dryden Ice Dogs (SIJHL), 8-1
Soo Thunderbirds defeated Fort Frances Lakers (Host-SIJHL), 6-3
Toronto Patriots (OJHL) defeated Soo Thunderbirds, 4-3 OT

Championship Game
Soo Thunderbirds defeated Fort Frances Lakers, 3-2

2015 Royal Bank Cup
Round Robin
Carleton Place Canadians (CCHL) defeated Soo Thunderbirds, 4-0
Melfort Mustangs (SJHL) defeated Soo Thunderbirds, 5-3
Portage Terriers (MJHL) defeated Soo Thunderbirds, 7-2
Penticton Vees (BCHL) defeated Soo Thunderbirds, 5-2

Awards
Top Defenceman (NOJHL Award) - Ethan Strong, Kirkland Lake Gold Miners
Most Improved (Gilles Laperriere Trophy) - Brennan Roy, Abitibi Eskimos
Top Defensive Forward (Mitch Tetreault Memorial Trophy) - Brett Jefferies, Soo Thunderbirds
Team Goaltending (NOJHL Award) - Mario Culina/Brian Kment, Soo Thunderbirds
Top GAA (Wayne Chase Memorial Award) - Mario Culina, Soo Thunderbirds
Top Scorer (Jimmy Conners Memorial Trophy) - Steve Harland, Powassan Voodoos
Most Valuable Player (Carlo Catterello Trophy) - Steve Harland, Powassan Voodoos
Top Rookie (John Grignon Trophy) - Steve Harland, Powassan Voodoos
Most Gentlemanly Player (Onaping Falls Huskies Trophy) - Nicolas Tassone, Soo Thunderbirds
Top Team Player (NOJHL Trophy) - Ethan Strong, Kirkland Lake Gold Miners
Scholastic Award (NOJHL Trophy) - 
CJHL Scholastic Nominee Award - 
Playoff's Most Valuable Player (NOJHL Trophy) - Owen Headrick, Soo Thunderbirds
Coach of the Year (Mirl "Red" McCarthy Memorial Award) - Jordan Smith, Soo Thunderbirds
Top Executive (Joe Drago Trophy) - Todd Stencill, Elliot Lake Wildcats

See also 
 2015 Royal Bank Cup
 Dudley Hewitt Cup
 List of NOHA Junior A seasons
 Ontario Junior Hockey League
 Superior International Junior Hockey League
 Greater Ontario Junior Hockey League
 2014 in ice hockey
 2015 in ice hockey

References

External links 
 Official website of the Northern Ontario Junior Hockey League
 Official website of the Canadian Junior Hockey League

2014–15 in Canadian ice hockey by league
2014